The Castle of Diósgyőr is a medieval castle in the historical town of Diósgyőr which is now part of the Northern Hungarian city Miskolc.
The first Castle of Diósgyőr was built probably in the 12th century and was destroyed during the Mongol invasion (1241–42). The current, Gothic castle was built after the invasion and reached the peak of its importance during the reign of King Louis the Great (1342-1382). Later it became a wedding gift for the queens of Hungary, which it remained until the Ottoman invasion of Hungary in the 16th century. By the end of the 17th century it was already in ruins. Archaeological excavations were made from the 1960s. In 2014 the castle was restored, the rooms are furnished with Mediaeval-style furniture.

History
The first castle was  built in the 12th century, it is likely that it was an earthwork and timber castle and was destroyed during the Mongol invasion (1241–1242.) The castle that stands today was probably built by King Béla IV, who, after the Mongols left the country, ordered a castle to be built on every hilltop. In the earliest times the castle was an oval structure with a rounded donjon, surrounded by a polygonal outer wall. In 1316 it was mentioned as "new castle", which confirms the theory that it was built in place of a destroyed castle. Judging from a document listing the taxes paid by towns in 1330 it seems the town around the castle was one of the richest towns of the county.

The castle had its prime during the reign of Louis I (Louis the Great). Its importance lay in standing near the road leading to Poland (the mother of Louis the Great, Elizabeth Lokietkówna, was a Polish princess; Louis himself became King of Poland in 1370.) The king had the castle rebuilt and modernised. Surrounded by several walls, the inner castle was built around a rectangular courtyard, and it had four towers, one on each corner. On the first floor were the storerooms and on the second floor were the rooms and the Knights' Hall, which was 25 meters long and 13 meters wide. The modernising of the castle was finished under the reign of Louis' daughter Mary. The castle was surrounded by a 4 metre deep moat.

In 1364 the nearby town Miskolc was annexed to the Diósgyőr estate. In 1381 the Peace Treaty of Turin was signed in the Diósgyőr Castle. In the treaty the Italian town of Venice was compelled to raise the flag of the Anjou dynasty on the St. Mark square every Sunday. In the north-eastern tower of the castle there is a waxworks exhibition showing the wax figures of King Louis and the Venetian envoy.

Diósgyőr lost some of its importance when the personal union between Hungary and Poland ended (Louis shared the two countries between his two daughters Mary and Jadwiga.) For the next few centuries the castle was a holiday residence for queens. The last queen owning the castle was Maria, wife of Louis II. She gave up the castle formally in 1546 (by this time it had been occupied by the ruling prince of Transylvania.)

When the Ottoman army began to occupy the southern territories of Hungary, the castle was fortified. Its owners, the Gyarmati Balassa family turned it into a large fortress, and they had an Italian-style rondelle built to the north-western tower. The slim turrets were replaced by strong bastions. This was the last time the castle was rebuilt; after 1564 the owners changed frequently, and the castle slowly deteriorated. In 1596 the Ottoman army occupied the Eger Castle and defeated the Christian army at Mezőkeresztes. The Diósgyőr Castle fell too; it was built to be a holiday residence and was never intended to be a large fortress that withstands the siege of a foreign army. From this time Diósgyőr was under Ottoman occupation and the area was ruled by the Pasha of Eger until 1687 when this part of the country was freed from Turkish rule. By this time the castle lost all of its military importance.

The castle today

The restoration of the castle began in 1953. Originally only the parts threatened with collapsing were restored, the archaeological excavation began only in 1960.

Before 2014 there was an exhibition of the history of the castle and the Pauline monastery, a weapons exhibition and the waxworks showing the signing of the Torino Peace Treaty in the northeastern tower (which belonged to the King's quarters). The north-western tower functions as a looking-tower, with a view on Diósgyőr and the surrounding hills; on the ground floor there is a small mint where tourists can make commemorative coins with their own hands. The south-western tower is in ruins. One of the main tourist attractions of the castle is a large waxworks exhibition in the outer castle. This exhibition is one of the largest waxworks exhibitions of Central Europe and it shows six scenes of everyday life in medieval Diósgyőr.

The Castle Plays are held twice in every year (May and August). Tournaments and open air plays are held at the castle, and there is a medieval fair next to the castle. An important musical event, the Kaláka Folk Festival is held on the second weekend of July each year.

Unlike the castles of Eger and Kőszeg, the Diósgyőr Castle is surrounded by modern concrete buildings instead of a historical town, but it is still a popular tourist destination, thanks to the castle plays, the museum, the waxworks exhibitions and Mrs. Déry's House, a small museum dedicated to the popular 19th-century actress Róza Széppataki Déry, in the house where she lived.

Literary associations

 On the wall of the castle there is a memorial plate commemorating the visit of the famous poet Sándor Petőfi to Diósgyőr on July 8, 1847. He wrote his poem Alkony ("Sunset") here.

Trivia
 The original picture that was used on the back of the 200 Forint banknote (in circulation between 1998 and 15 November 2009) is on display for visitors in the museum of the north-east tower.
 The spring that was used to fill the moat with water is now used as a water source for a public swimming pool nearby.

Gallery

Sources 

  Várépítészetünk, Főszerkesztő Gerő László, Műszaki Könyvkiadó, Budapest, 1975, 
  Czeglédy I.: A diósgyőri vár, Budapest, 1971
  Gerő László: A magyarországi várépítészet, Budapest, 1968
  Ferenczy K.: A diósgyőri vár műemlék-helyreállítási javaslatai, Magyar Építőművészet, 1961
  A vár történetét bemutató kiállítás
  Csorba Csaba: Regélő váraink. Javított kiadás, Helikon, Budapest, 2005. p. 65–70.

External links
 Official site 
 Aerial view of the castle
 Pictures of the castle and how it looked like in the Middle Ages
 Aerial photographs of the Castle
 History, pictures, and google map of the Castle
 Diósgyőr Castle on the official site of Miskolc Tourism 

Diosgyor, Castle of
Diosgyor, Castle of
Museums in Miskolc
Gothic architecture in Hungary
Diósgyőr
Tourist attractions in Miskolc